Tankurt Tan (born 27 November 1991), better known by his stage name Tankurt Manas, is a Turkish rapper and songwriter.

Discography

Studio albums
 Koleksiyon Vol.1 (2016)
 Koleksiyon Vol.2 (2016)
 Bilinçaltı (2018)

Singles and EPs

 Çene Kemiklerimi Kırdım (2013)
 Çene Kemiklerimi Kırdım (Remake) (2013)
 Nostal-G (2013)
 Sıkıntı Yok (2017)
 Bu Böyle (2017)
 Bu Benim Olayım (Tanerman Remix) (2018)
 Art Arda (2019)
 Mola (2019)
 Say (2019)
 Çift Telefon (2019) (feat. Yung Ouzo)
 Akbabalar (2019)
 Art Arda (Kevs Remix) (2019) (with Kevs)
 Düşüyorum (2019)
 Paramparça (2019)
 GOP City (2019)
 Beni 1 Salın (2019)
 KGY (2019)
 Ben Şimdi EYM #2 (2019)
 Bu Gece Bizim (2020) (with Grogi & Ceg)
 Uçuyorum (2020)
 Yeşil (2020)
 Katliam 4 (2020) (with Massaka, Diablo63, Anıl Piyancı, Killa Hakan, Eypio, Hidra, Yener Çevik, Selo, Joe Young, CashFlow, Tepki, Tekmill, Canbay & Wolker)
 Hepsini Vur (2020)
 Bilmiyorlar EYM #3 (2021)
 BBBY (2021)
 Beni Sevmon Mu? (2021) (with Sefo & Furkan Karakılıç)
 Deli midir Nedir? (2021) (with Ekin Ekinci)
 Test (2021)
 İçimde Biri Var (2021)
 Çift Telefon (2021) (feat. Yung Ouzo)
 DUMANLARX2 (2021)
 Son Vites (2021)
 Zincirler (2022) (with Love Ghost)
 Eyvah (2022) (with Reder)
 Aynen (2022)
 Lodos (64Bars) (2022) (with Efe Can)
 Puff Daddy (2022) (with İdo Tatlıses)

References 

Turkish rappers
Musicians from Istanbul
Living people
1991 births
Turkish lyricists
21st-century Turkish male singers
21st-century Turkish singers